Alphapapillomavirus is a genus of viruses, in the family Papillomaviridae. Human and  monkeys serve as natural hosts. There are 14 species in this genus. Diseases associated with this genus include: warts, papilloma, malignant tumours. Genital-type, high-risk of malignancy (cervical cancer): HPV-16, 18. Genital-type, low-risk of malignancy (genital warts): HPV-6, 11.

Taxonomy
The following species are assigned to the genus:
 Alphapapillomavirus 1
 Alphapapillomavirus 2
 Alphapapillomavirus 3
 Alphapapillomavirus 4
 Alphapapillomavirus 5
 Alphapapillomavirus 6
 Alphapapillomavirus 7
 Alphapapillomavirus 8
 Alphapapillomavirus 9
 Alphapapillomavirus 10
 Alphapapillomavirus 11
 Alphapapillomavirus 12
 Alphapapillomavirus 13
 Alphapapillomavirus 14

Structure
Viruses in Alphapapillomavirus are non-enveloped, with icosahedral geometries, and T=7 symmetry. The diameter is around 60 nm. Genomes are circular, around 8kb in length.

Life cycle
Viral replication is nuclear. Entry into the host cell is achieved by attachment of the viral proteins to host receptors, which mediates endocytosis. Replication follows the dsDNA bidirectional replication model. DNA templated transcription, with some alternative splicing mechanism is the method of transcription. Translation takes place by leaky scanning, and  ribosomal shunting. The virus exits the host cell by nuclear envelope breakdown.
Humans and  monkeys serve as the natural host. Transmission routes are sexual and contact.

References

External links
 ICTV Report Papillomaviridae
 Viralzone: Alphapapillomavirus
 ICTV

Papillomavirus
Virus genera